The 2018 U Sports Women's Final 8 Basketball Tournament was held March 8–11, 2018, in Regina, Saskatchewan. It was hosted by the University of Regina which had previously hosted the tournament in 1979, 2009, and 2013.

The top-seeded and undefeated Carleton Ravens won their first Bronze Baby championship in program history, defeating the sixth-seeded Saskatchewan Huskies. Besides the accomplishment in itself, the win buoyed Carleton's basketball program, whose men's team had failed to appear in the final game for the first time in eight years. The men won the bronze medal in Halifax earlier on the same day its women won the title in Regina.

Participating teams

Championship Bracket

Consolation Bracket

See also 
2018 U Sports Men's Basketball Championship

References

External links 
 Tournament Web Site

U Sports Women's Basketball Championship
2017–18 in Canadian basketball
2018 in women's basketball
2018 in Saskatchewan
University of Regina